is a Japanese freestyle swimmer.

She married swimmer Kazuya Kaneda in 2014.

Major achievements
 2005 World Championships – 200m freestyle 22nd (2:01.65)
 2007 World Championships – 100m freestyle 39th (57.21)
 2008 Beijing Olympics – 200m freestyle 13th (1:58.44)

Personal bests
In long course:
 100m freestyle: 55.05 (June 7, 2008)
 200m freestyle: 1:57.37 Japanese Record (April 9, 2011)

In short course
 100m freestyle: 53.41 former Japanese Record (February 22, 2009)
 200m freestyle: 1:53.72 Japanese Record, former Asian record (February 21, 2009)

References

External links
 Profile – JOC

1988 births
Living people
Olympic swimmers of Japan
Japanese female freestyle swimmers
Swimmers at the 2008 Summer Olympics
Swimmers at the 2012 Summer Olympics
People from Tokyo
Nihon University alumni
Olympic bronze medalists for Japan
Olympic bronze medalists in swimming
Swimmers at the 2006 Asian Games
Asian Games medalists in swimming
Swimmers at the 2010 Asian Games
Medalists at the 2012 Summer Olympics
Asian Games silver medalists for Japan
Asian Games bronze medalists for Japan
Medalists at the 2006 Asian Games
Medalists at the 2010 Asian Games